The SNCF Class BB 66600 is a small class of centre cab diesel locomotives rebuilt from the earlier Class BB 66000 by fitting a slightly more powerful engine. All members of the class were fitted for multiple working and all but two had electric train heating.

Initially all 11 were allocated to Nîmes to work services to Clermont-Ferrand.

Fleet List

References

66600
B-B locomotives
BB 66600
Standard gauge locomotives of France
Rebuilt locomotives